Jimmy Seaton (25 May 1891 – 3 January 1959) was an Australian rules footballer who played with Collingwood in the Victorian Football League (VFL).

Notes

External links 

Jimmy Seaton's profile at Collingwood Forever

1891 births
1959 deaths
Australian rules footballers from Victoria (Australia)
Collingwood Football Club players